John D. Puskas is an American researcher, author, inventor and cardiovascular surgeon. As of 2022, he is Professor, Cardiovascular Surgery, Icahn School of Medicine at Mount Sinai, and Chairman, Department of Cardiovascular Surgery at Mount Sinai Morningside, Mount Sinai Beth Israel and Mount Sinai West. He holds 11 U.S. patents and co-founded the International Coronary Congress and the International Society for Coronary Artery Surgery. He is credited by ResearchGate with 330 publications and 15,234 citations and as of 2022 Scopus reports an h-index of  62. Puskas is known for advancing coronary artery bypass (CABG) surgery by refining surgical techniques for all-arterial, off-pump CABG and inventing finer instruments to be used for advanced coronary bypass surgical procedures. He is credited with performing the first totally thoracoscopic bilateral pulmonary vein isolation procedure. He is the co-editor of State of the Art Surgical Coronary Revascularization, the first textbook solely devoted to coronary artery surgery.

In 2021, Puskas ran the New York City Marathon with his patient who, in 2018, suffered cardiac arrest and was clinically dead for five minutes, but recovered after all-arterial CABG. Their trainer, John Garlepp was another CABG patient of Puskas.

Career

Life and education 
Puskas received his MD at Harvard Medical School in 1986 and in 1991, a Master of Science in Surgical Science (MSc) at the University of Toronto. Post-graduate training included a general surgery internship and residency, department of surgery, Massachusetts General Hospital; fellowship in cardiothoracic surgery at Emory University Hospitals, Atlanta,  a lung transplantation research fellowship, division of thoracic surgery, Toronto General Hospital; and an advanced fellowship in tracheal surgery, Massachusetts General Hospital, Division of General Thoracic Surgery.

Research 
Puskas research concentrations include arterial bypass grafting, robotic and hybrid coronary bypass grafting, novel designs and materials for artificial heart valves, mitral and aortic valve repair and replacement, surgical and medical treatments for people with atrial fibrillation and surgical instruments for adult cardiac surgery.

He founded the Emory University Cardiothoracic Clinical Research Unit in 2005 and was a founding investigator in the creation of the NIH Cardiothoracic Surgery Trials Network in 2007; he has served on the steering committee of that NIH Network since that time. As of 2022, he has served as the principal investigator (PI) of five multi-center FDA investigatory drug/device exemption trials in cardiovascular surgery. At Mount Sinai Health System, he founded and directs the Cardiovascular Clinical Research Unit at Mount Sinai Morningside and Mount Sinai Beth Israel Hospitals to create a multidisciplinary collaborative clinical research infrastructure allowing clinical cardiologists and surgeons to enroll patients in multiple trials. He led 47 clinical sites nationwide to conduct the first RCT of hybrid coronary revascularization. He is listed on NIH RePORTER with 12 NHLBI PI roles.

Clinical and practice 
Puskas performs cardiovascular surgical procedures including all-arterial coronary bypass grafting, minimally invasive robotic coronary bypass surgery, hybrid coronary revascularization, off-pump coronary artery bypass surgery, ablation surgery for the treatment of atrial fibrillation, mitral valve repair/replacement, aortic valve replacement, valve-sparing aortic root replacement and surgery for aortic dissection. He performed the first triple off-pump bypass surgery using minimally invasive coronary artery bypass graft instrumentation in 1997. Between 1996 and 2022, he performed approximately 300 cardiac surgical cases annually, specializing in multiple arterial CABG and robotic CABG. In 2019, Puskas, with Gianluca Torregrossa, MD, successfully performed two totally endoscopic coronary arterial bypass surgeries (TECABs) making Mount Sinai the only New York State health system qualified to make the procedure available. As of 2022, Puskas has served as President of the International Society for Minimally Invasive Cardiothoracic Surgery (2009) and the International Society for Coronary Artery Surgery.

U.S. patents

Present societies 

 International Society for Minimally Invasive Cardiothoracic Surgery (ISMICS)
 Society of Thoracic Surgeons
 American College of Surgeons
 American Association for Thoracic Surgery
 American College of Chest Physicians
 American College of Cardiology

*Present indicates 2022

Publications

Editorial 
As of 2022, Puskas is a reviewer and editorial contributor to nine journals, including Annuals Thoracic Surgery, Journal of Thoracic and Cardiovascular Surgery, Heart Surgery Forum, The Lancet, The Journal of Cardiac Surgery, Circulation, Innovations, American College of Cardiology, European Association for Cardiothoracic Surgery.

Peer reviewed 
PubMed lists 320 publications as of 2022. A short list ranked by citations include:

Smith, P. K., Puskas, J. D., Ascheim, D. D., Voisine, P., Gelijns, A. C., Moskowitz, A. J., ... & Michler, R. E. (2014). Surgical treatment of moderate ischemic mitral regurgitation. New England Journal of Medicine, 371(23), 2178-2188; 273 citations

Puskas, J. D., Thourani, V. H., Marshall, J. J., Dempsey, S. J., Steiner, M. A., Sammons, B. H., ... & Guyton, R. A. (2001). Clinical outcomes, angiographic patency, and resource utilization in 200 consecutive off-pump coronary bypass patients. The Annals of thoracic surgery, 71(5), 1477-1484; 324 citations

Gaudino, M., Benedetto, U., Fremes, S., Biondi-Zoccai, G., Sedrakyan, A., Puskas, J. D., ... & Taggart, D. P. (2018). Radial-artery or saphenous-vein grafts in coronary-artery bypass surgery. New England Journal of Medicine, 378(22), 2069-2077; 295 citations

Gillinov, A. M., Gelijns, A. C., Parides, M. K., DeRose Jr, J. J., Moskowitz, A. J., Voisine, P., ... & Argenziano, M. (2015). Surgical ablation of atrial fibrillation during mitral-valve surgery. New England Journal of Medicine, 372(15), 1399-1409; 261 citations

El-Chami, M. F., Kilgo, P., Thourani, V., Lattouf, O. M., Delurgio, D. B., Guyton, R. A., ... & Puskas, J. D. (2010). New-onset atrial fibrillation predicts long-term mortality after coronary artery bypass graft. Journal of the American College of Cardiology, 55(13), 1370-1376; 338 citations

Books and chapters 
State of the Art Surgical Coronary Revascularization. 

Winston AD and Puskas JD. "Techniques for Multivessel OPCAB". Minimally Invasive Cardiac Surgery. 2ndEdition, edited by Oz MC and Goldstein DJ, Humana Press, 2003.

Sharoni E and Puskas JD. "Techniques in Multivessel OPCAB". Operative Cardiac Surgery, edited by Gardner T J and Spray TL, Arnold Publishers, 2004.

Thourani VH and Puskas JD. "Coronary Artery Bypass Procedures·Medical Management of the Surgical Patient." Fourth Edition, edited by Lubin MF, Walker HK, Smith RB III, 2006.

Song HK and Puskas JD. "Off-pump Coronary Artery Bypass Surgery". Mastery of Cardiothoracic Surgery, 2nd Edition, Lippincott Williams and Wilkins, New York, 2007.

Richard J. Myung and John D. Puskas. "Off-Pump Coronary Artery Bypass Grafting for Repeat Coronary Revascularization", Redo Cardiac Surgery in Adults, 2nd Edition, Edited by Venkat R. Machiraju, Hartzell V. Schaff and Lars G. Svensson. Springer. 2011.

Michael E. Halkos, John D. Puskas. "Minimally Invasive Coronary Artery Bypass Graft to Cardiac Surgery: Recent Advances and Techniques", 2012.

Yanagawa B and Puskas JD. “Off-Pump Coronary Artery Bypass Grafting”, in Mastery of Techniques in Cardiac Surgery, 2016.

Michael E. Halkos, Emmanuel Moss, and John D. Puskas. “Chapter 2 Off-pump versus on-pump coronary artery bypass grafting”, in Core Concepts in Cardiac Surgery, Edited by David Taggart and Yasir Abu-Omar, Oxford University Press, 2018.

Bobby Yanagawa, Michael E. Halkos, John D. Puskas. “Chapter 21: Myocardial Revascularization Without Cardiopulmonary Bypass”, in Cardiac Surgery in the Adult, 5e, Edited by Lawrence H. Cohn, David H. Adams, Cenveo® Publisher Services, 2018.

See also 
 Mario Gaudino - cardiac surgeon and expert in coronary revascularization

References

External links
 The Cardiothoracic Surgery Network
 The Society of Thoracic Surgeons
 American Association for Thoracic Surgery
 International Society for Minimally Invasive Cardiothoracic Surgery
 International Coronary Congress

American cardiac surgeons
American thoracic surgeons
American cardiologists
Icahn School of Medicine at Mount Sinai faculty
Harvard Medical School alumni
Massachusetts General Hospital residents
20th-century surgeons
21st-century surgeons
Cardiovascular researchers
Living people
Year of birth missing (living people)